The 2014–15 Iona Gaels men's basketball team represented Iona College during the 2014–15 NCAA Division I men's basketball season. The Gaels, led by fifth year head coach Tim Cluess, played their home games at the Hynes Athletic Center and were members of the Metro Atlantic Athletic Conference. They finished the season 26–9, 17–3 in MAAC play to finish win the MAAC regular season championship. They defeated Siena and Monmouth to advance to the championship game of the MAAC tournament where they lost to Manhattan. As a regular season champion who failed to win their conference tournament, they received an automatic bid to the National Invitation Tournament where they lost in the first round to Rhode Island.

Roster

Schedule

|-
!colspan=9 style="background:#990033; color:#FFCC00;"| Regular season

|-
!colspan=9 style="background:#990033; color:#FFCC00;"| MAAC tournament

|-
!colspan=9 style="background:#990033; color:#FFCC00;"| NIT

References

Iona Gaels men's basketball seasons
Iona
Iona